The 2018 W-League grand final was the final match of the 2017–18 W-League season and deciding the champions of women's football in Australia for the season.

The match took place at Allianz Stadium in Sydney, Australia on 18 February 2018 and was played by Sydney FC and reigning league champions Melbourne City. The match was won by Melbourne City 0–2, who recorded their third consecutive league championship. At the time, the attendance of 6,025 was a record for W-League grand finals.

Teams

Route to the final

Match details

Match statistics

See also
 List of W-League champions

Notes

References

Grand final
Soccer in Sydney
A-League Women Grand Finals